The 2017 season was T–Team's 6th season in Liga Super since being promoted.

Sponsors
Title sponsor
 Chicken Cottage
Shirt sponsor
 Kobert
Official sponsors
 Terengganu Incorporated

Competitions

Overview

{| class="wikitable" style="text-align: center"
|-
!rowspan=2|Competition
!colspan=8|Record
|-
!
!
!
!
!
!
!
!
|-
| Liga Super

|-
| Piala FA

|-
| Piala Malaysia

|-
! Total

Pre-season and friendlies

Liga Super

Matches

Source: Fixtures

League table

Piala FA

Piala Malaysia

Group stage

Statistics

Appearances
Correct as of match played on 28 October 2017

Top scorers
Correct as of match played on 28 October 2017
The list is sorted by shirt number when total goals are equal.

Clean sheets
Correct as of match played on 28 October 2017
The list is sorted by shirt number when total clean sheets are equal.

Transfers

In

First window

Second window

Out

First window

Second window

References

Terengganu F.C. II
Malaysian football clubs 2017 season